Holden is a village in central Alberta, Canada. It is located south of Vegreville. The village is named after former Alberta MLA James Holden.

Demographics 

Notable people 
Dale Armstrong, drag racer
Ted Newall, businessman

See also 
List of communities in Alberta
List of villages in Alberta

References

External links 

1909 establishments in Alberta
Beaver County, Alberta
Villages in Alberta